Springsteen on Broadway is a soundtrack album by American rock singer-songwriter Bruce Springsteen. It features the complete audio of Springsteen's solo Broadway performance at the Walter Kerr Theatre in New York, recorded live on July 17 and 18, 2018, and filmed for Netflix. The album was released on December 14, 2018, by Columbia Records.

After release, Springsteen on Broadway impacted the top 10 of record charts in more than 10 countries, including Australia, Germany, Italy, the Netherlands, Switzerland, and the United Kingdom. In the United States, it reached number 11 on the Billboard 200. A widespread critical success, the album was praised for examining Springsteen's recording persona and an autobiographical dimension recalling the musician's 2016 autobiography Born to Run.

Critical reception 

Springsteen on Broadway was met with widespread critical acclaim. At Metacritic, which assigns a normalized rating out of 100 to reviews from mainstream publications, the album received an average score of 87, based on 15 reviews.

Reviewing for The Daily Telegraph in December 2018, Neil McCormick said "Springsteen on Broadway may not have the musical expanse of his work with the E Street Band, but it is still as powerful as any album he has ever made", especially applauding its autobiographical dimension, which he compared to Springsteen's 2016 autobiography Born to Run. McCormick also highlighted Springsteen's humor and instincts as an onstage anecdotist. Alexis Petridis of The Guardian said listeners of the album will learn that Springsteen's recording persona is "as much a contrived character" as David Bowie's Ziggy Stardust character. Overall, he found that this "cocktail of homespun wisdom, frankness and blatant yarn-spinning is genuinely enthralling, a portrait of the rock star as a complex, conflicted 69-year-old man."

In hailing the performance as "a new type of rock show", Record Collector magazine's Jamie Atkins felt Springsteen is the only musician of his pedigree to have "the connection with their audience, the storytelling nous, the humour and pathos". In Rolling Stone, Will Hermes described it as "by turns audiobook, podcast, and live album, and at its most potent when it becomes a hybrid of the three", while Kitty Empire regarded it as being "located somewhere between a TED talk, an episode of VH1's Storytellers and a confessional ... a hugely nourishing listen". Despite having never been "big on extended spoken-word material or solo-acoustic remakes of exalted songbooks", Robert Christgau said in his column for Vice that he was impressed by performance. In appraising the record as a whole, he said:

Track listing

Personnel 
Credits adapted from the album's liner notes.

 Bruce Springsteen – vocals, guitar, piano, harmonica
 Patti Scialfa – vocals and guitar on "Tougher Than the Rest" and "Brilliant Disguise" 
Technical personnel

Bruce Springsteen – production
John Cooper, Greg Allen – recording
Bob Clearmountain – mixing
Sergio Ruelas Jr. – music editor
Brandon Duncan – associate music editor
Bob Ludwig – mastering
 Brian Ronan – sound design
Brett Dicus – technical manager
Rob Lebret – technical coordinator
 Mary O'Brien – personal assistant to the Springsteens
Benjamin Travis – general manager
Kevin Buell – guitar technician
John Cooper – house mixer
Dan Lee – teleprompter
Shannon Slaton – deck audio, monitors mixer
Mike Tracy – associate sound designer
Chris Sloan – production sound
Mike Miccio – piano technician
Michelle Holme – art direction, design
Danny Clinch, Rob Demartin, Prez Powerz – photography

Charts

Weekly charts

Year-end charts

Certifications

References

External links 
 

2018 soundtrack albums
Bruce Springsteen albums